András Kun, O.F.M. (9 November 1911 – 19 September 1945 in Budapest, Hungary) was a Roman Catholic priest of the Franciscan Order. During the Holocaust in Hungary, Kun was also the commander of an Anti-Semitic death squad for the Arrow Cross Party. After the Second World War, Kun was prosecuted for war crimes by a Hungarian People's Tribunal after Hungary's occupation by Soviet armies. He was convicted and hanged.

Life

Early life and Church career
András Kun was born 8 November 1911 in Nyírbátor, Kingdom of Hungary.  He attended seminary in Rome. He then served as a priest in a Franciscan monastery. In 1943, Kun was, according to journalist Rezső Szirmai, expelled from the monastery and moved to Budapest.

Although it is uncertain whether he ever had valid faculties, Kun sometimes gave sermons and offered Nuptial Masses at Sacred Heart of Jesus Roman Catholic Church in Városmajor.

Participation in the Holocaust
In early 1944, Kun enrolled in Hungary's Pro-Nazi Arrow Cross Party. During the lead-up to the German invasion of Hungary in 19 March 1944, Kun participated in the Arrow Cross' seizure of power by distributing weapons on 15 October 1944..

Kun later recalled, "The propaganda drilled into us the belief that the Jews lurk behind the Bolsheviks. Amidst the wildest battles, I stood with this conviction and as Jews came before me, I beat them."

Soon after, the Arrow Cross and the Schutzstaffel began the extermination of Jews in Hungary (deportation made from April to October in 1944, death squad attacks happened on the war zones from October 1944 to February 1945). Meanwhile, Kun took command of an Arrow Cross department death squad in the XII. district in Budapest, after Ferenc Szálasi and his government left Budapest on the end of November in 1944 because the Hungarian capital started being besieged by the Soviet Red Army. His squad started making massacres against the remained or hiding Jews (who were not only the official Budapest Ghetto but some hospitals, elderly homes, houses what belonged neutral states such as Switzerland or Sweden). During these activities, he continued to dress in his cassock and Roman collar along with a holstered pistol and an Arrow Cross armband. His orders usually ran, "In the name of Christ - fire!"

In a later interview with journalist Rezső Szirmai, Kun recalled, "I always wanted to reduce human misery and suffering. This is why I fought against the Jews. They are the lords of capital. The Jews were always the ones to walk on the sunny side of the street."

In January 1945 (meanwhile Kun took over even in North-Pest and the Headquarter of the Arrow Cross party in district VI where he moved from the XII. district), Kun ordered the arrest of Jewish author Ernő Ligeti and his family. Kun and his death squad brutally tortured Ligeti's son and his wife. The Ligetis were then taken to Arrow Cross headquarters at Andrássy út 60, interrogated, stripped naked and tied together. Then, around midnight, they faced a firing squad. Ernő Ligeti and his wife were killed on the spot, but their son Károly, survived four bullets, recovered from his wounds, and later emigrated from Hungary.

On 12 January 1945, Kun's squad broke into the Jewish hospital in Maros street (Hospital of the Buda Chevra Kadisha), where 149 Jewish patients and doctors were summarily shot. On another occasion, the St. John's Hospital was invaded by Kun's unit and between 80 and 100 people were murdered. His squad also invaded sheltered housing and abducted some 500 Jews and their protectors. All were lined up and shot into the Danube River. On another occasion, men under Kun's command broke into a sanatorium, where 100 Jewish patients were shot to death.

Kun did not flee the city before the Siege of Budapest but remained behind while continuing operations. Before the German Army exploded all of the bridge of Budapest. As the enclosed area narrowed in January, the proud bridges of Budapest flew into the air one after another. At the end of December 1944, the Southern Connecting Railway Bridge, on January 15 the Miklós Horthy Bridge, on the 16th the Ferenc József Bridge, and the last 2 was exploded only 18 January. Kun helped a lot of local squads to move and escape to Buda and he put his headquarter back to the XII. district. His squad routinely subjected Gentiles who were hiding Jews to torture and execution.

At the end even the official Arrow Cross government authorities (Nemzeti Számonkérő szék) fed up his atrocities (he started attacking a lot of premises what was under the protection of the neutral countries especially Switzerland and Sweden, and the Szalasi government was afraid about the derogation of her last international relations.) So around 18 January in 1945 a police patrol was ordered to capture him on his headquarters in 5th Németvölgyi út. Kun captured them, beat all of them to blood, and then sent the policemen back. Ten another policemen were sent against him, but Kun also captured them, beat their commanders to blood, and locked them in the basement. Eventually, sixty police officers surrounded the Headquarter and then issued an ultimatum to the insiders: if Kun and some of his companions were not extradited within ten minutes, a machine gun attack would be launched to occupy the building. The insiders fulfilled the condition of the ultimatum and handed over them, ending Kun's three-month terror.

The charges of the National Calling to Account Department against him were: On January 18, 1945, Lieutenant Colonel Rezső Mindák was severely beaten, and later arrested and severely abused a section of  police officers in the party house. He was arrested on January 19, 1945, and then sentenced to death because of twenty-seven from the about 3000 murders. He was saved from execution by Ferenc Szálasi, who changed the sentence to 15 years in prison by his radio telegram.

He was presumably released from prison by Soviet troops who did not know who were the prisoners so they let out everyone. His track lost in the following months. He probably pretended to be a Romanian citizen (he also spoke Romanian) and left for Arad with the Romanian troops involved in the siege of Budapest.  From here he intended to escape to Italy, but on the Hungarian side of the border he was captured on August 3, 1945 around Dombegyháza by the border guard.

He was transported to Budapest on August 30 for trial.

Capture and execution
Soon after his release, the Soviet Army completed their capture of Budapest. Kun was arrested and tried for 500 murders by a Hungarian People's Tribunal. On the day of his execution, he gave an interview to journalist Reszső Szirmai. In the interview, Kun admitted to beating Jews, but denied killing anyone and claimed to have been falsely convicted. Kun told Szirmai that he considered himself to be even more of a victim than any of the Jews murdered in the Holocaust.

When Szirmai commented that the manner in which Kun had treated his victims displayed signs of sadism, Kun replied, "This perversion exists, in a dormant state, in every soul." When asked if it existed in his soul as well, Kun responded: "If it did, then it was dormant. I was not conscious of it."

Kun was executed by hanging in Budapest on September 19, 1945.

Legacy
Rezső Szirmai went on to interview 20 other Arrow Cross war criminals and published a book-length collection of his interviews, Fasiszta lelkek ("Fascist Souls"), in 1946. Some of his other interview subjects included Ferenc Szálasi, Andor Jaross, and Béla Imrédy. After the fall of Communism in Hungary, a second edition was published in 1993.

Kun's cassock is currently on display at the House of Terror in Budapest. In his bestselling history of the Siege of Budapest, Hungarian historian Krisztián Ungváry describes Kun's crimes in detail. In the process, however, he also comments that, while Kun and his unit were massacring Jews, the Papal Nuncio to Hungary, Angelo Rotta, was working closely with Raoul Wallenberg and other neutral diplomats and helped to save tens of thousands of Jewish lives.

References

1911 births
1945 deaths
20th-century Hungarian Roman Catholic priests
Brown priests (Nazism)
Catholic priests convicted of murder
Christian fascists
Executed Hungarian collaborators with Nazi Germany
Holocaust perpetrators in Hungary
Hungarian people convicted of war crimes
Hungarian Nazis
People executed by Hungary by hanging
People executed for war crimes
Catholicism and far-right politics